The finances of the British royal family come from a number of sources. The British government supports the monarch and some of his family financially by means of the Sovereign Grant, which is intended to meet the costs of the sovereign's official expenditures. This includes the costs of the upkeep of the various royal residences, staffing, travel and state visits, public engagements, and official entertainment. Other sources of income include revenues from the Duchies of Lancaster and Cornwall, income from assets of other trusts, income from private investments, and a parliamentary annuity.

The Keeper of the Privy Purse is Head of the Privy Purse and Treasurer's Office and has overall responsibility for the management of the sovereign's financial affairs.

Sovereign Grant 

The Sovereign Grant is paid annually to the monarch by the Treasury to fund the monarch's official duties, replacing the system of funding the Royal Household by a mixture of civil list payments and grants-in-aid. The level of funding for the Royal Household is now linked to the Government's revenue from the Crown Estate.

The Sovereign Grant Annual Report states that the Sovereign Grant was £31 million for 2012–13, £36.1 million for 2013–14 and £37.9 million for 2014–15. The amount of the Sovereign Grant is equal to 15% of the income account net surplus of the Crown Estate for the financial year that began two years previously. Step 4 of subsection 6(1), and subsection 6(4), of the Act provide a mechanism to prevent the amount of the Sovereign Grant increasing beyond what is necessary because of the growth in Crown Estate revenue. Under the Sovereign Grant the National Audit Office is able to audit the Royal Household.

On 18 November 2016, a plan was announced to increase the Sovereign Grant from 15% to 25% to renovate and repair Buckingham Palace. The percentage is set to revert to 15% when the project is finished in 2027. As a result, the Sovereign Grant amounted to £76.1m for 2017–18, which for the first time included the "dedicated amount £30.4m" to renovate Buckingham Palace. As of March 2019, the Sovereign Grant Reserve amounts to £44.4 million, with £36.8 million of it set aside "to meet future commitments for the Reservicing of Buckingham Palace".

Civil list 

Until 1760, the monarch met all official expenses from hereditary revenues, which included the profits of the Crown Estate (the royal property portfolio).  King George III agreed to surrender the hereditary revenues of the Crown in return for payments called the civil list. Under this arrangement, the Crown Estate remained the property of the sovereign, but the hereditary revenues of the crown were placed at the disposal of the House of Commons. The civil list was paid from public funds and was intended to support the exercise of the monarch's duties as head of state of Great Britain. This arrangement persisted from 1760 until 2012. In modern times, the Government's profits from the Crown Estate always significantly exceeded the civil list. Under the civil list arrangements, the royal family faced criticism for the lack of transparency surrounding Royal finances. The National Audit Office was not entitled to audit the Royal Household.

The Queen received an annual £7.9 million a year from the civil list between 2001 and 2012. The total income of the Royal Household from the Treasury was always significantly larger than the civil list because it included additional income such as grants-in-aid from the Treasury and revenues from the Duchies of Cornwall and Lancaster. The total Royal Household income for the financial years 2011–12 and 2012–13 was £30 million per annum, followed by a 14% cut in the following year. However, the Treasury provided an additional £1 million to pay for Diamond Jubilee celebrations in 2012.

Royal expenditure differs from income due to the use of a Reserve Fund, which can be added to or drawn from. The official reported annual expenditure of the Head of State was £41.5 million for the 2008–09 financial year. This figure did not include the cost of security provided by the police and the Army and some other expenses. The campaign group Republic says that the full annual cost of the British monarchy is at least £345,000,000 a year, when including lost revenue from the two duchies, security, costs met by local councils and police forces, and lost tax revenue.

Assets held in trust by the Sovereign 
A number of possessions are held in trust by the Sovereign. These possessions are exempt from inheritance tax.

The Crown Estate is one of the largest property portfolios in the United Kingdom, producing £211 million for the Treasury in the financial year 2007–08 and with holdings of £7.3 billion in 2011. The Crown Estate is not the personal property of the Monarch. It cannot be sold by the sovereign in a personal capacity, nor do any revenues, or debts, from the estate accrue to him. Instead, the Crown Estate is owned by the monarch in right of the Crown, a corporation sole representing the legal embodiment of the state. It is held in trust and governed by Act of Parliament, to which it makes an annual report. Revenue from the Crown Estate has been predicted to double in real terms between 2010 and 2020 with additional lease revenues deriving from the development of offshore wind farms within Britain's Renewable Energy Zone, the rights of which were granted to the Crown Estate by the Energy Act 2004.
The Duchies of Lancaster and Cornwall are Crown entities holding land and other assets to produce an income for, respectively, the British Sovereign (now King Charles III) and the monarch's eldest son (if he is next in line to the throne). The revenue profits of the Duchy of Lancaster are presented to the Sovereign each year and form part of the Privy Purse, providing income for both the official and private expenses of the monarch. The Duke of Cornwall receives revenue for charitable work and official activities. These financial arrangements also cover the official expenditure of some members of his immediate family.
The occupied official royal residences such as Buckingham Palace, Holyrood Palace and Windsor Castle are held in trust by the sovereign, as is the Palace of Westminster. The Royal Household is expected to use the Sovereign Grant to maintain the residences. In May 2009 the Queen requested an extra £4 million annually from the government to carry out a backlog of repairs to Buckingham Palace. In 2010, the Royal Household requested an additional grant from the Department for Culture, Media and Sport but were refused on the basis that the scheme was "aimed at schools, hospitals, councils and housing associations for heating programmes which benefit low-income families". Over a third of the Royal estate was in disrepair by 2012–13 according to a report by the Public Accounts Committee. The cost of restoration was estimated to be £50 million, but the Reserve Fund was at a historic low of £1m. The monarch is also responsible for using the Sovereign Grant to pay the wages of 431 of the approximately 1,200 Royal Household staff, amounting to £18.2 million in 2014–15. In 2013, the Guardian newspaper reported that Buckingham Palace was using zero-hour contracts for its summer staff. In 2015 it was reported that at least four senior officials had been made redundant to reduce costs.
The Royal Collection is the art collection of the British royal family. It is one of the largest and most important art collections in the world, containing over 7,000 paintings, 40,000 watercolours and drawings, about 150,000 old master prints, historical photographs, tapestries, furniture, ceramics, books, gold and silver plate, arms and armour, jewellery and other works of art. The collection includes the Crown Jewels in the Tower of London (including the crown, orb and sceptre). It is physically dispersed between thirteen Royal residences and former residences across Britain. Although the collection belongs to the sovereign, it is not the personal property of Charles III as a private individual. Instead the collection is held in trust by the King for his successors and the nation. The Treasury says these assets are "vested in the sovereign and cannot be alienated". Income is generated by the collection from public admissions and other sources. This income is received by the Royal Collection Trust, the collection's management charity, and not by the King.
 The Royal Archives comprises collections including diaries, letters, household papers and administrative records of the British monarchy.

Private estate of the Sovereign 
The late Queen Elizabeth II had a private income from her personal investment portfolio, though her personal wealth and income were not known.

In 2002, she inherited her mother's estate, thought to have been worth £70 million (the equivalent of about £ today). Sandringham House and Balmoral Castle are privately owned by the Sovereign.

Estimates of personal wealth 
Jock Colville, a former private secretary to Queen Elizabeth II (when she was Princess Elizabeth) and a director of her bank, Coutts, estimated her wealth at £2 million in 1971 (the equivalent of about £ today).

An official statement from Buckingham Palace in 1993 called estimates of £100 million "grossly overstated".

Forbes magazine estimated the Queen's net worth at around $500 million (about £325 million) in 2011, while an analysis by the Bloomberg Billionaires Index put it at $425 million (about £275 million) in 2015.

In 2012 the Sunday Times estimated the Queen's wealth as being £310 million ($504 million), and that year the Queen received a Guinness World Record as Wealthiest Queen.

The Sunday Times Rich List 2015 estimated her wealth at £340 million, making her the 302nd richest person in the United Kingdom; that was the first year she was not among the Sunday Times Rich List's top 300 most wealthy since the list began in 1989. She was number one on the list when it began in 1989, with a reported wealth of £5.2 billion, which included state assets that were not hers personally, (approximately £ in today's value).

Parliamentary annuities
The Duke of Edinburgh received a parliamentary annuity of £359,000 per year from the Treasury. In the past some other members of the British royal family also received funding in the form of parliamentary annuities. The Civil List Act 1952 provided for an allowance to Princess Margaret as well as allowances to the queen's younger children among others. The Civil List Act 1972 added further members of the royal family to the annuity list. By 2002 there were eight recipients of parliamentary annuities, all receiving a combined total of £1.5 million annually. Between 1993 and 2012 the Queen voluntarily refunded the cost of these annuities to the Treasury. The Sovereign Grant Act 2011 abolished all of these other than that received by the then Duke of Edinburgh. Subsequently, the living costs of the members of the royal family who carry out official duties, including the Princess Royal, the Duke of York, and the Duke and Duchess of Edinburgh, have mainly been met through the sovereign's income from the Duchy of Lancaster.

Taxation 
The Crown has a legal tax-exempt status because certain Acts of Parliament do not apply to it. Crown bodies such as The Duchy of Lancaster are not subject to legislation concerning income tax, capital gains tax or inheritance tax. Furthermore, the Sovereign has no legal liability to pay such taxes. The Duchy of Cornwall claims a Crown exemption meaning the Prince of Wales is not legally liable to pay income or corporation tax on Duchy revenues, although this has been disputed. The prince voluntarily pays income tax, although questions have been raised about expense claims that would limit his tax liability.

A "Memorandum of Understanding on Royal Taxation" was published on 5 February 1993 and amended in 1996, 2009 and 2013. It is intended that the arrangements in the memorandum will be followed by the next monarch. The memorandum describes the arrangements by which the Queen and the Prince of Wales make voluntary payments to the HM Revenue and Customs in lieu of tax to compensate for their tax exemption. The details of the payments are private.

The Queen voluntarily paid a sum equivalent to income tax on her private income and income from the Privy Purse (which includes the Duchy of Lancaster) that is not used for official purposes. The Sovereign Grant is exempted. A sum equivalent to capital gains tax is voluntarily paid on any gains from the disposal of private assets made after 5 April 1993. Many of the Sovereign's assets were acquired earlier than this date but payment is only made on the gains made afterwards. Arrangements also exist for a sum in lieu of inheritance tax to be voluntarily paid on some of the Queen's private assets. Property passing from monarch to monarch is exempted, as is property passing from the consort of a former monarch to the current monarch.

King Charles III, when he was Prince of Wales, voluntarily paid a sum equivalent to income tax on that part of his income from the Duchy of Cornwall that was in excess of what was needed to meet official expenditure. From 1969 he made voluntary tax payments of 50% of the profits, but this reduced to 25% in 1981 when he married Lady Diana Spencer. These arrangements were replaced by the memorandum in 1993. The income of the Prince of Wales from sources other than the Duchy of Cornwall is subject to tax in the normal way.

Lobbying and legal exemptions 
In November 1973, the Queen's private lawyer successfully lobbied the UK government to change proposed legislation in order to conceal her private wealth from the public. The government subsequently inserted a clause into the law granting itself the power to exempt companies used by “heads of state” from new transparency measures. This hid the Queen's private shareholdings and investments until 2011.

On other occasions the monarch's advisers requested exclusions from proposed laws relating to road safety and land policy that might affect her estates, and pressed for government policy on historic sites to be altered.

The Queen was exempted from the 2017 Cultural Property (Armed Conflicts) Act, a law that seeks to prevent the destruction of cultural heritage, such as archaeological sites, works of art and important books, in future wars. This means police are barred from searching the Queen's private estates for stolen or looted artefacts.

The Queen's lawyers also lobbied Scottish ministers to change a draft law, the Heat Networks (Scotland) Bill, to exempt her private land from an initiative to cut carbon emissions. As a result, the Queen was the only person in Scotland not required to facilitate the construction of pipelines to heat buildings using renewable energy.

The Guardian identified 67 instances in which Scottish bills have been reviewed by the Queen. They include legislation dealing with planning laws, property taxation, protections from tenants and a 2018 bill that prevents forestry inspectors from entering crown land without the Queen's permission.

A spokesperson for the Queen said: "Queen's Consent is a parliamentary process, with the role of sovereign purely formal. Consent is always granted by the monarch where requested by government."

See also
 Republicanism in the United Kingdom

References

External links
Sovereign Grant Report 2020-2021, Summary
Queen Elizabeth II just died. Here’s what will happen to her $500 million fortune, Fortune magazine, 8 September 2022

British monarchy
British royal family
Finance in the United Kingdom
Monarchy and money